Arunawati Dam is an earthfill and gravity dam on Arunawati river near Digras in Yavatmal district of state of Maharashtra in India.

Specifications

Purpose
 Irrigation & Flood Control

See also
 Isapur Dam
 Upper Pus Dam in Pusad 
 Lower Pus Dam in Mahagaon
 Dams in Maharashtra
 List of reservoirs and dams in India

References

Dams in Yavatmal district
Dams completed in 1994
1994 establishments in Maharashtra